Germain Dirksz (born August 15, 1976) is an Aruban football player. He has played for the Aruba national team during the 2002 FIFA World Cup qualifying rounds.

References

External links

1976 births
Living people
Aruban footballers
Association football forwards
SV Britannia players
Aruba international footballers